The Growlers is an American band from Southern California. They began their career in the Orange County city of Dana Point, California in 2006. They are currently based in Costa Mesa. The band is currently composed of singer Brooks Nielsen and keyboard player/guitarist Kyle Straka. They have released seven albums, several EPs and a number of singles. The band's sound has been described as "a trademark style of music that somehow combines surf, pop, rock and beat" which has been labeled "Beach Goth".

History

Singer Brooks Nielsen and music director/guitarist Matt Taylor met in middle school in the beach town of Dana Point, California, bonding over surfing, skating, and partying. When offered the chance to perform at a house party, the duo quickly wrote their first six songs in a single day, leading to the first incarnation of the band that would eventually become The Growlers. 

After releasing a handful of self-recorded cassettes and CDs, The Growlers issued their first studio album, Are You in or Out? in 2009 on Everloving Records. Aquarium Drunkard described it as “consistent in sound and tone that is as enjoyable straight through or on shuffle… Taken as a whole, the record is a beautiful mix of late 60’s freak-out, folk calmness and surf rock.”  Their second album, Hot Tropics, was released in 2010, also on Everloving Records. The band's third album, Hung at Heart, the first to feature Anthony Braun Perry on bass and Jason Kaiser on percussion, was released in 2013. The band originally worked with Dan Auerbach to record the album, but the finished version never saw official release. Instead the band recorded a new version of the album in Costa Mesa, CA with Mike McHugh at his Distillery Recording Studio, to get a more lo-fi sound. 

Chinese Fountain, their new "more grown up, well polished" album was released September 23, 2014. This album was produced by JP Plunier at Seahorse Studios in Los Angeles, CA. While touring the album, the band expanded their live band with percussionist Nick Murray.

The band's fifth studio album, City Club was released by Cult Records on September 30, 2016, while they embarked on a supporting tour in the same month. It was the first Growlers album to be credited solely to Brooks Nielsen and Matt Taylor, as opposed to the whole band. Nielsen and Taylor wrote and recorded demos for the album over a span of two to three months with the help of Kyle Mullarky at his studio in Topanga Canyon, CA. It was preceded by the title track as a single produced by Julian Casablancas, who also owns the label. Neither drummer Scott Montoya nor bass player Anthony Perry feature on the album. On September 25, the band confirmed Montoya's departure from the band and stated that Perry was set to return in the near future. The band toured for this album with Brad Bowers on bass, Adam Wolcott Smith on keyboard, and Richard Gowen on drums. Whether their membership in the band is permanent is currently unclear.

The band released Casual Acquaintances on July 27, 2018, a collection of demos and unused material from the City Club sessions.  

The Growlers have toured with artists such as The Black Keys, Devendra Banhart, Julian Casablancas, Night Beats, and Jonathan Richman. They have also appeared at numerous festivals including Coachella, Bonnaroo, Primavera Sound, Lollapalooza, Austin City Limits, Sasquatch!, Wakarusa, Treasure Island, Fun Fun Fun, Bestival, Way Out West, End of The Road, Burgerama III, Rock in Rio and Outside Lands.

Beach Goth

The band has organized their annual Beach Goth festival since 2012. The event typically features performances by bands representing a variety of genres, including pop, rap, hip hop, heavy metal, and rock. Over the years, the event has included costume contests, amusement park rides, and live performances of Rocky Horror Picture Show. The Growlers have headlined both Saturday and Sunday night of the annual Beach Goth festival since its inception.

The likes of Die Antwoord, Grimes, Gucci Mane, Julian Casablancas, Mac DeMarco, The Drums, Foxygen, White Arrows and Ghost B.C. have appeared at the festival.

Beach Goth 4 (October 2015) was hosted by Pauly Shore and featured live performances of Rocky Horror Picture Show throughout the weekend as well as a performance of The Doors song "People Are Strange" by The Growlers and Julian Casablancas.

The 2016 edition of Beach Goth took place at The Observatory in Santa Ana, CA on October 23–24, 2016. It was originally scheduled to take place at the Oak Canyon Park but was moved last minute due to unexplained circumstances. The festival's lineup included Bon Iver, TLC, James Blake, 2 Live Crew, Violent Femmes, Future Islands, Reel Big Fish, The Faint, the Pharcyde, Leftöver Crack, and DJ Quik. While it was hailed a success, the outdoor festival suffered from rain and resultant street flooding. This caused the Growlers to delay their own set due to equipment damage. In the aftermath, the band issued an apology.

Due to an ongoing lawsuit with Noise Group (owners of The Observatory venue) over the Beach Goth trademark, 2017's festival took on the name "The Growlers Six", which took place on October 28 & 29 at the LA Waterfront. The festival included artists such as the Yeah Yeah Yeahs, Modest Mouse, and the Butthole Surfers.

The Growlers returned to their trademarked "Beach Goth" brand name for the 7th annual festival, taking place at the Los Angeles Historic State Park on August 5, 2018. Beach Goth 7 hosted performances by The Growlers, Jonathan Richman, The Voidz, The Drums, La Luz, and GWAR.

Allegations of sexual misconduct 
In July 2020, allegations of sexual misconduct surfaced against the band, along with other artists associated with Burger Records and the Southern California surf and garage rock music scene. Arrow De Wilde, the lead singer of the L.A. rock band Starcrawler, shared a personal encounter on her Instagram page. In her post, Arrow claims she was assaulted by a male stripper hired by The Growlers while they were on tour together in Australia. In a statement issued via Instagram on July 31, 2020, Growlers singer Brooks Nielsen took "full responsibility and accountability for the behavior of all Growlers' band members, past and present," and announced that Matt Taylor would temporarily leave the band. Additionally, former Growlers touring keyboardist Adam Wolcott Smith admitted to an incident of abuse on his Instagram, while on tour with his band Zen Mother.

Discography

Studio albums
Are You In or Out? (2009), Everloving Records
Hot Tropics (2010), Everloving Records
Hung at Heart (2013), Everloving Records (US), FatCat Records (UK & Europe), Smack Face Records (Australia & New Zealand)
Chinese Fountain (2014), Everloving Records (US), FatCat Records (UK & Europe), Smack Face Records (Australia & New Zealand)
City Club (2016), Cult Records (US/EU)
Natural Affair (2019), Beach Goth Records & Tapes

EPs
Split Growlers/Thee Ludds (2011), Palmist, limited to 500 copies
Gay Thoughts/Uncle Sam's a Dick (2013), Ayo Silver
Gilded Pleasures (2013), Everloving Records (US), Smack Face Records (Australia & New Zealand)
Lonely This Christmas (2017), Beach Goth Records & Tapes
Dream World (2020), Beach Goth Records & Tapes
Empty Bones / Graveyard's Full (2020) Beach Goth Records & Tapes

Other releases
Greatest sHits (2007), self-released
Casual Acquaintances (2018) Beach Goth Records & Tapes (US)

Singles
"Gay Thoughts" / "Feeling Good" (2011), Everloving, limited to 1000 copies on 7" vinyl
"Uncle Sam's a Dick" / "Drinking Song for Kids" (2012), no label, limited to 500 copies, of which 250 each were sold online and at concerts on 7" vinyl
"Late Bloomers" (2017), Cult Records LLC
"Monotonia" (2017), Beach Goth Records & Tapes
"California" (2017), Beach Goth Records & Tapes
”Who Loves The Scum?” (2018), Beach Goth Records & Tapes
"Natural Affair" (2019), Beach Goth Records & Tapes
"Foghorn Town" (2019), Beach Goth Records & Tapes
"Try Hard Fool" (2019), Beach Goth Records & Tapes
"Pulp Of Youth" (2019), Beach Goth Records & Tapes

References

External links

Psychedelic rock music groups from California
Musical groups established in 2006
Musical groups from Orange County, California
Garage rock groups from California
2006 establishments in California
Cult Records artists
FatCat Records artists